Policy & Internet is a quarterly peer-reviewed academic journal published by Wiley-Blackwell on behalf of the Policy Studies Organization. The journal was established in 2009 and its editor-in-chief is Jonathon Hutchinson with Managing Editor, Milica Stilinovic both from University of Sydney. The journal focuses on the effects of the Internet on public policy, including the ethical implications of new technologies such as social networking, platforms, and algorithms.

Abstracting and indexing
The journal is abstracted and indexed in Current Contents/Social & Behavioral Sciences, ProQuest databases, Scopus, and the Social Sciences Citation Index.

References

External links

Wiley-Blackwell academic journals
English-language journals
Publications established in 2009
Political science journals
Quarterly journals